The 2018 AFC Champions League group stage was played from 12 February to 18 April 2018. A total of 32 teams competed in the group stage to decide the 16 places in the knockout stage of the 2018 AFC Champions League.

Draw

The seeding of each team in the draw was determined by their association and their qualifying position within their association. The mechanism of the draw was as follows:
For the West Region, a draw was held for the three associations with three direct entrants (United Arab Emirates, Iran, Qatar) to determine the seeds 1 placed in order for Groups A, B and C. The remaining teams were then allocated to the groups according to the rules set by AFC.
For the East Region, a draw was held for the two associations with three direct entrants (South Korea, Japan) to determine the seeds 1 placed in order for Groups E and F. The remaining teams were then allocated to the groups according to the rules set by AFC.

The following 32 teams entered into the group-stage draw, which included the 24 direct entrants and the eight winners of the play-off round of the qualifying play-offs, whose identity was not known at the time of the draw.

Format

Tiebreakers

Schedule
The schedule of each matchday was as follows.
Matches in the West Region were played on Mondays and Tuesdays (two groups on each day).
Matches in the East Region were played on Tuesdays and Wednesdays (two groups on each day).

Neutral venues
In light of the deterioration of Iran–Saudi Arabia relations since 2016, which caused matches between teams from Iran and Saudi Arabia to be played on neutral venues in 2016 and 2017, and the Qatar diplomatic crisis since 2017, which led to travel bans imposed by Saudi Arabia and United Arab Emirates to Qatar, the AFC reiterated that matches should be played on a home-and-away basis as normal instead of on neutral venues, and would try to mediate the situation with the concerned associations (Iran, Qatar, Saudi Arabia, United Arab Emirates), such that a solution could be found regarding matches between teams from Iran/Qatar and Saudi Arabia/United Arab Emirates. In the end, the same arrangements were made as of the previous season, where matches between Iran and Saudi Arabia were played on neutral venues, while teams from Saudi Arabia and United Arab Emirates must travel to Qatar to play away matches.

Groups

Group A

Group B

Group C

Group D

Group E

Group F

Group G

Group H

Notes

References

External links
, the-AFC.com
AFC Champions League 2018, stats.the-AFC.com

2
February 2018 sports events in Asia
March 2018 sports events in Asia
April 2018 sports events in Asia